Mercer County is a county located in the central part of the U.S. Commonwealth of Kentucky. As of the 2020 census, the population was 23,772. Its county seat is Harrodsburg. The county was formed from Lincoln County, Virginia in 1785 and is named for Revolutionary War General Hugh Mercer, who was killed at the Battle of Princeton in 1777. It was formerly a prohibition or dry county.

History
Harrodsburg was the first city formally chartered in Kentucky County, the Virginia district that later became the 15th state. It was originally the county seat of Lincoln County when it was formed in 1780, but it became the seat of Mercer County when it was created.

Pleasant Hill, also known as Shakertown, is the site of a former Shaker community, active especially in the years before the American Civil War. It is a National Historic Landmark District, consisting of more than 30 historic buildings. The district also includes acres of farm and parkland.

During the Civil War, the county was divided in sentiment. Union control permitted the organization 2 Union regiments, the 19th Regiment Kentucky Volunteer Infantry and the 11th Regiment Kentucky Volunteer Cavalry. However, many county men also served in the Confederate Army. The 19th Kentucky Infantry (Union) was organized at Camp Harwood for a three-year enlistment commencing January 2, 1862, commanded Col. William J. Landram. Companies A, C, D, and F of the 11th Kentucky Cavalry (Union) were organized at Harrodsburg in July 1862. The remainder of the regiment was organized in Louisville, Kentucky, and mustered in for three years on September 26, 1862, under the Colonel Alexander W. Holeman. Following the Battle of Perryville, much of Harrodsburg and surrounding towns were converted into makeshift hospitals; 1600 sick and wounded Confederate soldiers were captured during a raid in Harrodsburg by the 9th Kentucky Cavalry on October 10, 1862. The city then remained under martial law for the remainder of the war.

The Louisville Southern Railroad reached Harrodsburg in 1888. Louisville Southern Railway's construction commenced in 1884 and ran from Louisville through Shelbyville and Lawrenceburg to Harrodsburg, which was reached in 1888. The rail yard and station were located at the corner of Office Street and Merimon Avenue.  A spur was later constructed from the station to Burgin, where the Louisville Southern joined the Cincinnati Southern's Cincinnati, New Orleans and Texas Pacific Railway CNO&TP mainline which runs through the eastern part of the country from High Bridge of Kentucky to Burgin to Danville was opened in 1877. Now all run and operated by Norfolk Southern Railway.

Company D of the 192nd Tank Battalion, which took part in the World War II Battle of Bataan was from Harrodsburg.

Geography

Mercer County is located in central Kentucky in the Bluegrass region.

Adjacent counties
 Anderson County (north)
 Woodford County (northeast)
 Jessamine County (east)
 Garrard County (southeast)
 Boyle County (south)
 Washington County (west)

Demographics

As of the census of 2000, there were 20,817 people, 8,423 households, and 6,039 families residing in the county. The racial makeup of the county was 94.00% White, 3.69% Black or African American, 0.21% Native American, 0.47% Asian, 0.03% Pacific Islander, 0.63% from other races, and 0.96% from two or more races.  1.27% of the population were Hispanics or Latinos of any race.

There were 8,423 households, out of which 31.80% had children under the age of 18 living with them, 57.80% were married couples living together, 10.40% had a female householder with no husband present, and 28.30% were non-families. 25.10% of all households were made up of individuals, and 11.60% had someone living alone who was 65 years of age or older.  The average household size was 2.45 and the average family size was 2.93.

By age, 24.40% of the population was under 18, 7.40% from 18 to 24, 29.10% from 25 to 44, 24.50% from 45 to 64, and 14.60% were 65 or older.  The median age was 38 years. For every 100 females there were 94.00 males.  For every 100 females age 18 and over, there were 89.70 males.

The median income for a household in the county was US$35,555, and the median income for a family was $43,121. Males had a median income of $33,657 versus $22,418 for females. The per capita income for the county was $17,972.  About 10.00% of families and 12.90% of the population were below the poverty line, including 17.40% of those under age 18 and 12.00% of those age 65 or over.

Notable people
 Ralph G. Anderson, founder Belcan Corporation, philanthropist
 Jacqueline Coleman, 58th Lieutenant Governor of Kentucky (2019-  )
 Maria Thompson Daviess (1872–1924), author
 Jason Dunn, National Football League player
 David Winfield Huddleston, Christian author and minister
 Rachel Jackson, wife of President Andrew Jackson
 Frances Wisebart Jacobs, philanthropist
 Ann O'Delia Diss Debar,  late 19th and early 20th century medium and criminal.
 Dennis Johnson, National Football League player
 William Logan, politician
 Beriah Magoffin, Governor of Kentucky (1859 − 1862) and namesake of Magoffin County, Kentucky
 William Sullivan, politician and lawyer
 John Burton Thompson, politician
 Al Wilson, actor and stunt pilot
 Craig Yeast, National Football League player

Law and government

Local attractions
 Old Fort Harrod State Park, features a reconstruction of Fort Harrod, the first permanent settlement in the state of Kentucky.
 Shaker Village of Pleasant Hill, a living history museum.
 Herrington Lake

Communities

Cities
 Burgin
 Harrodsburg

Census-designated place
 Salvisa

Unincorporated communities

 Bondville
 Bushtown (east)
 Bushtown (west)
 Cornishville
 Duncan
 Ebenezer
 Mayo
 McAfee
 Pleasant Hill
 Talmage

Ghost town
 Hilltop

Education
School districts include:
 Burgin Independent School District
 Mercer County Schools

Notable residents
 John Adair, member of the United States House of Representatives and United States Senate, also governor of Kentucky

See also

 National Register of Historic Places listings in Mercer County, Kentucky

References

External links
 Mercer County web site

 
Kentucky counties
1785 establishments in Virginia
Populated places established in 1785
Former counties of Virginia